Cape Henry Collegiate (formerly Cape Henry Collegiate School, also known as Cape Henry or CHC) is a private, college-preparatory, coeducational, day school located in Virginia Beach, Virginia.

History

Cape Henry Collegiate is the oldest accredited private, college-preparatory, co-educational, independent day school in Virginia Beach, Virginia. Cape Henry sits on a 30-acre campus in a residential area within five miles of the Atlantic Ocean. Established in 1924 as the Everett School, the school enrolls 1050 students from Pre-K3 through 12th grade.

It is accredited by the Virginia Association of Independent Schools (VAIS), Southern Association of Independent Schools (SAIS), and Southern Association of Colleges and Schools (SACS) and is recognized as an accredited school by the Virginia Board of Education.

Tuition (2021-2022 school year) ranges from $12,850 in Pre-Kindergarten to $21,440 in grades 9–12. Private School | Cape Henry Collegiate in Hampton Roads VA

Academics
CHC focuses on STEM subjects and recently constructed a state-of-the-art science center in 2007 to support STEM education.

Cape Henry is known for its global education program. Students are afforded the opportunity to graduate with a distinction as a global scholar and participate in cultural, language, and academic immersion programs domestically and abroad. Past trips have included collaborations in countries including but not limited to Panama, South Africa, Spain, Morocco, Romania, Turkey, and Israel.

Athletics

Cape Henry offers 22 Varsity sports.

The boys soccer team and girls field hockey teams have won back-to-back state championships.

Since 2004, State Championships have been earned in Baseball (2010,2012), Boys Basketball (2012, 2015), Boys Lacrosse (2004), Boys Soccer (2017, 2018,2019), Boys Tennis (2012, 2013), Girls Basketball (2011, 2012), Field Hockey (2005, 2010, 2011, 2017, 2018,2019) Girls Lacrosse (2007, 2012), Girls Tennis (2008, 2011, 2013, 2014) and Girls Volleyball (2008, 2009, 2010, 2011).
 
Recent Championships (2018-2019):
2019 TCIS Regular Season, Tournament Champion, and Division I Boys State Soccer Champions ≤https://www.pilotonline.com/757teamz/soccer/vp-sp-cape-henry-boys-soccer-visaa-20191109-mslgoubj5rgzlef7zc32qvd6ga-story.html≥
2019 TCIS Tournament Champions and Division II Girls State Field Hockey Champions ≤https://www.pilotonline.com/757teamz/vp-sp-saturdays-high-school-highlights-20191110-6fbxjklm6zho5ityci6xvlz3wy-story.html≥
2019 TCIS Regular Season & Tournament Championship Golf Team
2019 TCIS Regular Season & Tournament Championship Wrestling Team
2019 Regular Season Boys Basketball Championship Team
2018 TCIS Regular Season & TCIS Tournament Championship Wrestling Team
2018 TCIS Tournament Championship Girls T&F Team 
2018 TCIS Tournament Championship Coed Golf Team
2018 TCIS Tournament Champion & State Championship Field Hockey Team
2018 TCIS Regular Season, TCIS Tournament, & State Championship Boys Soccer Team
2017 State Championship Field Hockey Team
2017 TCIS Regular Season, TCIS Tournament, & State Championship Boys Soccer Team
2017 TCIS Regular Season & Tournament Championship Wrestling Team
2017 TCIS Regular Season Championship Boys Tennis Team
2017 TCIS Invitational Championship Boys Volleyball Team

Sports 
The following sports are offered to boys at Cape Henry Collegiate:

The following sports are offered to girls at Cape Henry Collegiate School:

Accreditation, affiliations, and associations 
Cape Henry Collegiate School is accredited, affiliated, or associated with the following organizations:
 National Association of Independent Schools (NAIS)
 Southern Association of Independent Schools (SAIS)
 Virginia Council for Private Education (VCPE)
 Association of College Counselors in Independent Schools (ACCIS)
 AdvancED
 Association of Independent School Admissions Professionals (AISAP)
 Council for Advancement and Support of Education (CASE)
 The Cum Laude Society 
 Educational Records Bureau (ERB)
 Global Education Benchmarking Group (GEBG)
 Independent School Data Exchange (INDEX)
 Southern Association of Colleges and Schools (SACS)
 National Association for College Admission Counseling (NACAC)
 National Business Officers (NBOA)
 National Honor Society (NHS)
 Potomac and Chesapeake Association for College Admission Counseling (PCACAC)

Notable faculty and alumni

 Tim Hummel – former Major League Baseball player and current coach at CHC.
Kate Kinnear, former US Field Hockey and current coach at CHC.
Devon Hall, NBA player for the Oklahoma City Thunder
Alex Ghenea, music producer and Recording Academy member
Will Overman, professional musician
Sean Poppen, MLB player for the San Diego Padres
Matt Audette, CFO LPL Financial holdings
Logan Tucker, CEO L2 Services

References

Private high schools in Virginia
Schools in Virginia Beach, Virginia
History of Virginia Beach, Virginia
Educational institutions established in 1924
1924 establishments in Virginia